Dhunia Tirutabur is a 2009 Indian Assamese movie directed by Prodyut Kumar Deka and produced by Prodyut Kumar Deka & Pankaj Kalita under Arc Lights. Music was composed by Angarag Papon Mahanta. It was released on  9 January 2009. It received three Assam State Film awards in 2010 in the category of Best Director, Best Editor and Best Make Up.

Cast
 Bidyut Chakrabarty
 Trisha Saikia
 Barsha Rani Bishaya
 Nilakshi Devi
 Ankur Bishaya
 Barnali Poojari
 Nayan Saikia
 Konki Bordoloi

Special cast
 Jatin Bora
 Sanjeev Hazarika
 Indra Bania
 Nayan Prasad

Plot

Borgohain, a journalist of repute, was traveling to the countryside for a break. When his car breaks down in the middle of a rainy night, a nearby mechanic comes to fix it. Learning his identity, the mechanic has a request of his own. He has been pining for a beautiful maid, who had accompanied a film unit during shooting at the countryside. She was a personal helper to a leading actress, who incidentally has vanished from the film industry. 
Borgohain agrees to look for her out of curiosity. More of a love story than a traditional mystery, his investigation takes him across the world of show business and make believe people.

See also
 List of Assamese films of the 2000s

References

2009 films
Films set in Assam
2000s Assamese-language films